is a Japanese boxer. He competed in the men's flyweight event at the 1968 Summer Olympics.

References

1948 births
Living people
Japanese male boxers
Olympic boxers of Japan
Boxers at the 1968 Summer Olympics
Sportspeople from Ōita Prefecture
Flyweight boxers